The Monroe Center Historic District is a  historic district in Monroe, Connecticut with significance dating to 1762.  It was listed on the National Register of Historic Places in 1977.

It includes about 60 significant buildings, including Federal style St. Peters Church at the south end of the Monroe Center green.  On June 30, 1781, a dance was held on the green for about 600 of French general Rochambeau's troops that were camped nearby, during their march towards Yorktown, Virginia which led to American-French victory in the American Revolutionary War.

See also

March Route of Rochambeau's army
List of historic sites preserved along Rochambeau's route
National Register of Historic Places listings in Fairfield County, Connecticut

References

Houses on the National Register of Historic Places in Connecticut
Georgian architecture in Connecticut
Federal architecture in Connecticut
Colonial Revival architecture in Connecticut
Historic districts in Fairfield County, Connecticut
Monroe, Connecticut
Historic places on the Washington–Rochambeau Revolutionary Route
National Register of Historic Places in Fairfield County, Connecticut
Houses in Fairfield County, Connecticut
Historic districts on the National Register of Historic Places in Connecticut